Police Old Town is the old town (oldest historic district) of the town of Police, Poland in the Pomerania Region.

Monuments

There are a few interesting monuments in Police, e.g.

Brick Gothic Chapel (15th century) in The Chrobry Square in The Old Town
Neo-Gothic Church (19th century) in The Old Town
The Police Lapidary in The Staromiejski Park in The Old Town
Tenement houses (19th century)
Town hall (1906) was not rebuilt after World War II

The tourist and cultural information office is localised in The Gothic Chapel in The Bolesław Chrobry Square.

Yacht marina
A yacht marina 'Olimpia' is on the Łarpia River (part of Oder).

Communication 

Roads:
to Trzebież and Nowe Warpno, No. 114
to Tanowo, No. 114
to Szczecin over Przęsocin
Main streets in a town:
ul. Grunwaldzka
ul. Kościuszki
ul. Wojska Polskiego
ul. Piłsudskiego
Szczecin - Police - Trzebież Railway
Harbours:
Police Sea-Harbour
Police River-Harbour
Public transport:
bus lines 101, 102, 103, 106, 109, 110, 111. Bus communication between all districts of a town, a few villages near Police (Trzeszczyn, Tanowo, Siedlice, Leśno Górne, Pilchowo, Przęsocin and Szczecin City
LS (linia samorządowa)(different type of ticket) to Trzebież over Dębostrów, Niekłończyca and Uniemyśl)
Taxicab

External links
 Police on the old photo

Police, West Pomeranian Voivodeship